R v Collins 1973 QB 100 was a unanimous appeal in the Court of Appeal of England and Wales which examined the meaning of "enters as a trespasser" in the definition of burglary, where the separate legal questions of an invitation based on mistaken identity and extent of entry at the point of that beckoning or invitation to enter were in question.

Collins was a 19-year-old workman with access to a ladder to a very small family he knew of after a late-night drinking. He was convicted of burglary: with intent to commit rape of an 18-year-old woman and sentenced to a term of imprisonment.  This was overturned at this appeal.

Facts 
The victim had seen her boyfriend a few hours before the relevant intercourse in question, who was blond and of a similar build to the defendant.  She was somewhat inebriated when they parted and she went to bed; she slept naked that July night in her room, the location of which the defendant knew having done some work in the house.  At 02:00 the defendant climbed the ladder and, alleging much dutch courage, caught sight of the sleeping woman, stripped to his socks, and rested kneeling on the sill - he "was just pulling [him]self in" to ask for sex when the victim awoke, and immediately believed she was greeting her boyfriend.  The two had sex in bed.  In conversation afterwards the victim realised her mistake (making a mistake of identity) and struck and bit her unintended partner; no charges were placed for this reaction.  He left the house.  His account that he would not have entered were it not for the invitation was rejected by the jury.  He had stated in evidence that it was his firm intention to "have his way with a girl" that night.

Trial and appeal
The defence barrister submitted during the trial that because she had invited him into her bedroom, even under a mistake of fact, Collins had not "entered as a trespasser". The judge rejected this. The judge made mistakes. He should have listed all issues very relevant to make out the offence under the statute. 
At least two were not put to the jury:-
as to where exactly Collins had been at the time of her mistaken invitation—outside the window on the outer sill or already inside the bedroom—and the evidence was inconclusive on that point.
as to whether it was reckless entry to assume the embrace was intended for him which the victim intended towards her boyfriend entering the room.  If so it should be stated that reckless entry, believing or having good reason to think he was not invited, would amount to trespass.

Decision 
The point in issue had never been adjudicated one so there was no authority on which the court could rely; instead, three completing analyses of the most distinguished textbooks were weighed up.

Having examined these, the court ruled that the person entering: 

The court considered that on the facts, the judge had misdirected the jury on this test. It was also considered, obiter, that civil law concepts such as trespass ab initio and her occupancy status were irrelevant to the criminal law.

The court allowed the appeal on the basis that the jury had never been invited to consider
whether Collins was a trespasser 
when he rested on the sill; and then 
when he fully entered X's bedroom. 
even if he were not on the ordinary basis a trespasser, whether he was reckless as to his entry on the basis of consent not intended for him and should have realised himself to be a trespasser

The conviction was duly quashed.

External links 

Full text of decision

Footnotes

References 

1972 in British law
C
Court of Appeal (England and Wales) cases
1972 in case law